Bangladesh Institute of International and Strategic Studies (BIISS) is a state owned autonomous national research institute and think tank working as a statutory institute that carries out research on security and strategic issues in Bangladesh and is located in Dhaka, Bangladesh. Major General Shaikh Pasha Habib Uddin is current Director General  and Tariq Ahmed Karim I s the current Chairman of BIISS.

History
The institute was established in 1978 by the Government of Bangladesh as a statutory organisation. The institute is under the Ministry of Foreign Affairs.

References

Research institutes in Bangladesh
1978 establishments in Bangladesh
Think tanks based in Bangladesh
Organisations based in Dhaka